Ryder Devapriam (3 July 1931 – 4 September 1992) was systematic theologian who taught during the 1960s and the 1970s at the Andhra Christian Theological College, a Protestant Regional Theologiate in Secunderabad, affiliated to the nation's first University, the Senate of Serampore College (University) {a University under Section 2 (f) of the University Grants Commission Act, 1956}with degree-granting authority validated by a Danish Charter and ratified by the Government of West Bengal.

Devapriam hailed from the Nandyal Diocese of the Church of South India and served as Bishop in Nandyal Diocese from 1985–1992.

Studies

General
Devapriam pursued graduate and postgraduate degrees from Madras University, Chennai and Nagpur University, Nagpur.

Spiritual
Devapriam chose the vocation of Priesthood and enrolled for B. D. at the Bishops College, Kolkata where Emani Sambayya happened to be one of the Spiritual Formators.

Before joining as Faculty Member of the Andhra Christian Theological College in Rajahmundry, Devapriam pursued a postgraduate degree leading to Master of Sacred Theology specializing in the discipline of Systematic theology at the McCormick, Chicago.

While teaching at the Andhra Christian Theological College which by then relocated from Rajahmundry to Secunderabad, Devapriam sought study leave from the Board of Governors of the College for undergoing further studies on a World Council of Churches scholarship in 1975 enrolling at the General Theological Seminary, New York City and rejoined the Protestant Regional Theologiate in Secunderabad in 1981.

Ministry

Teaching
Devapriam was on the faculty of the Andhra Union Theological College, Dornakal, teaching along with Eric J. Lott, CSI, P. Victor Premasagar, CSI and B. E. Devaraj.  In 1964, efforts were made by some of the Protestant Societies to come together in forming a united theologiate in Andhra Pradesh and Telangana comprising the Anglicans, Congregationalists and the Wesleyans represented through the Church of South India and the Church of North India, the Baptists through the Convention of Baptist Churches of Northern Circars and later on by the Samavesam of Telugu Baptist Churches, the Lutherans through the Andhra Evangelical Lutheran Church and the South Andhra Lutheran Church and the Methodists through the Methodist Church in India.

The efforts towards coming together of some of the Protestant societies resulted in the formation of the Andhra Christian Theological College in Rajahmundry in 1964 which was carved out of four existing century-old seminaries, namely,
 the Andhra Union Theological College, Dornakal,
 the Baptist Theological Seminary, Kakinada,
 the Lutheran Theological College, Rajahmundry,
 the Ramayapatnam Baptist Theological Seminary, Ramayapatnam.

The Nandyal Diocese which was founded by the Society for the Propagation of the Gospel (SPG) was one of the founders of the College which was represented on the Faculty through B. E. Devaraj followed by Ryder Devapriam who joined the College during the 1960s in Rajahmundry and moved on to Secunderabad when the College was relocated serving under the Old Testament Scholars, W. D. Coleman, AELC and followed by P. Victor Premasagar, CSI.  It was during the 1970s that Devapriam went on to pursue doctoral studies in 1975 and returned in 1981 by which time the New Testament Scholar K. David, CBCNC became the Principal.

During Devapriam's tenure at the College, his co-faculty included R. R. Sundara Rao, AELC, G. Solomon, STBC, Muriel Spurgeon Carder, CBCNC, M. Victor Paul, AELC, Suppogu Joseph, STBC, G. Devasahayam, AELC, Eric J. Lott, CSI  Ravela Joseph, STBC and others.  Devapriam taught Systematic theology along with Waldo Penner, CBCNC, one of the co-founders of the College hailing from the Convention of Baptist Churches of Northern Circars and was joined by R. Yesurathnam, CSI in 1974.

Pastoral
The Diocese of Nandyal, founded by the Society for the Propagation of the Gospel could not join the Uniting church (Church of South India) in 1947.  During the intervening period, the Diocese was under the care of the Church of India, Pakistan, Burma, and Ceylon followed by the Church of North India.  Finally, after protracted ecclesiastical conversations, the Diocese of Nandyal was able to join the Church of South India only in 1975.  Devapriam, as a Priest of the Diocese of Nandyal had been involved in the ecumenical conversations resulting in the union.

In 1985, Devapriam was consecrated as Bishop by the Moderator Isaiah Jesudason, CSI and Deputy Moderator Sundar Clarke, CSI at the CSI-Holy Cross Cathedral in Nandyal.  Devapriam was elected as the Moderator of the Church of South India Synod held in 1992 at the XXIII session held in the Diocese of Tirunelveli at Palayamkottai.

During Devapriam's bishopric lasting nearly a decade, he attended the twelfth Lambeth Conference in 1988 presided by Robert Runcie, CoE, the Archbishop of Canterbury.

Honours, death and reminiscence

Honours
During the convocation of the General Theological Seminary, New York City held in March 1992, Devapriam was conferred with a Doctor of Divinity degree by Honoris causa along with other notable Clergy comprising Herbert W. Chilstrom of the Evangelical Lutheran Church of America, Robert Louis Ladehoff of the Episcopal Diocese of Oregon, Helen Brogden Turnbull of the Episcopal Church and Gayraud Wilmore of the Presbyterian Church.

Death
Devapriam died on 4 September 1992 during an overseas sojourn in Germany and within a day he was brought back to Hyderabad and then taken by road to Nandyal, where he was buried.  Then-Prime Minister P. V. Narasimha Rao was instrumental in the quick passage of the body of Devapriam from Germany to India.

At the funeral ceremony held at Nandyal, bishops from the various dioceses of the Church of South India were present, including: P. Victor Premasagar; C. D. Jathanna; Samuel Amirtham; D. P. Shettian; N. D. Anandarao Samuel; S. J. Theodore; B. P. Sugandhar; G. Dyvasirvadam and others.

The Andhra Christian Theological College, where Devapriam had been a teacher, was also represented by the members of its faculty.

Reminiscence
Talathoti Punnaiah, who studied a 3-year theology course leading to Bachelor of Theology at the Andhra Christian Theological College, both at Rajahmundry and at Hyderabad from 1970–1973, recalls his association with Ryder Devapriam:

References
Notes

Further reading
 
 
 
 
 

Anglican bishops of Nandyal
Telugu people
20th-century Anglican bishops in India
Indian Christian theologians
Senate of Serampore College (University) alumni
1992 deaths
McCormick Theological Seminary alumni
General Theological Seminary alumni
University of Madras alumni
Rashtrasant Tukadoji Maharaj Nagpur University alumni
1931 births
Academic staff of the Senate of Serampore College (University)
Church of South India clergy
Moderators of the Church of South India